Holy Trinity Church ( Surp Yerrordut'yun Yekeghets'i) is an Armenian Apostolic Church constructed in 2003 in the Malatia-Sebastia District of Yerevan, Armenia.  It is modeled after the 7th century Zvartnots Cathedral.

The construction works of the church planned to be built on the South-Western District of Yerevan started in March 2001. The Church was built according to the project of architect Baghdasar Arzoumanian with the sponsorship of American Armenian national benefactor Mrs. Louise Simone Manoogian. On November 9, 2004, Karekin II, Catholicos of All Armenians, presided over the ceremony of consecration of the crosses of the Church of Holy Trinity. The Church of Holy Trinity was consecrated by Karekin II on November 20, 2005.

Gallery

External links
 Holy Trinity Church - Araratian Diocese
 About the Holy Trinity Church in Yerevan

Armenian Apostolic church buildings in Yerevan
Churches completed in 2003